William Reddick may refer to:
 William Reddick (politician) (1812–1885), Irish-American businessman, politician and philanthropist
 William H. Reddick (1840–1903), American Civil War Medal of Honor recipient
 Bill Reddick (footballer) (William Thomas Reddick, 1935–2008), Australian rules footballer 
 Bill Reddick (artist), Canadian artist
 Josh Reddick (William Joshua Reddick, born 1987), American baseball outfielder